HMAS Glenelg (J236/M236), named for the city of Glenelg, South Australia, was one of 60  constructed during World War II, and one of 36 initially manned and commissioned solely by the Royal Australian Navy (RAN).

Design and construction

In 1938, the Australian Commonwealth Naval Board (ACNB) identified the need for a general purpose 'local defence vessel' capable of both anti-submarine and mine-warfare duties, while easy to construct and operate. Construction of the prototype  did not go ahead, but the plans were retained. The need for locally built 'all-rounder' vessels at the start of World War II saw the "Australian Minesweepers" (designated as such to hide their anti-submarine capability, but popularly referred to as "corvettes") approved in September 1939, with 60 constructed during the course of the war: 36 (including Glenelg) ordered by the RAN, 20 ordered by the British Admiralty but manned and commissioned as RAN vessels, and 4 for the Royal Indian Navy.

Glenelg was laid down by the Cockatoo Island Dockyard at Sydney, New South Wales on 2 March 1942. She was launched on 25 September 1942 by the wife of Doctor H.V. Evatt, then Minister for External Affairs, and was commissioned into the RAN on 16 November 1942.

Operational history
Glenelg began her career as a convoy escort along the east coast of Australia, initially from Queensland to New Guinea before being assigned to the Sydney to Queensland leg in May 1943. In December, the corvette began a refit.

On completion, she was assigned to New Guinea waters as an anti-submarine patrol and convoy escort ship for the duration of 1944; during this time the ship sailed  and was active for over 10,000 hours. On 20 October 1944, the corvette was called to assist an American patrol under heavy mortar fire near Maffin Bay in Dutch New Guinea. Glenelg’s whaler was deployed to help move the American wounded; although swampled, the boat was dragged ashore by her crew, with seating and flooring boards used as improvised stretchers to move the wounded to the American-controlled bank of the Woske River. Glenelg, under the guidance of two US Army personnel standing on the beach, fired 31 rounds from her  main gun at the Japanese attackers, and was later praised by the patrol's senior officer as the decisive factor in allowing the patrol to withdraw with all wounded, leaving five dead behind.

The corvette arrived in Australia at the start of 1945 for a two-month refit in Melbourne, before returning to Manus Island and spending the remainder of the war as a convoy escort. After the end of World War II, Glenelg was involved in the reoccupation of Ambon during September, before departing for Fremantle on 1 November, visiting her namesake city en route.

The corvette earned two battle honours for her wartime service: "Pacific 1942–45" and "New Guinea 1943–44".

Decommissioning and fate
Glenelg was paid off into reserve in Fremantle on 14 January 1946. She was sold to the Hong Kong Rolling Mills on 2 May 1957 for breaking up as scrap.

Citations

References
Books

Journal and news articles

External links

Bathurst-class corvettes of the Royal Australian Navy
Ships built in New South Wales
1942 ships
World War II corvettes of Australia